Oropesa del Mar is a municipality in the comarca of Plana Alta in the Valencian Community, Spain.

References

Municipalities in the Province of Castellón
Plana Alta